Jeffrey Allen Reboulet (born April 30, 1964) is a former Major League Baseball infielder.  He is an alumnus of Louisiana State University and a graduate of Archbishop Alter High School.

Drafted by the Minnesota Twins in the 10th round of the 1986 MLB amateur draft, Reboulet made his major league debut with the Twins on May 12, 1992, and appeared in his final game during the 2003 season.

Notes

External links

Baseball players from Dayton, Ohio
1964 births
Living people
Minnesota Twins players
Baltimore Orioles players
Kansas City Royals players
Los Angeles Dodgers players
Pittsburgh Pirates players
Major League Baseball third basemen
Major League Baseball shortstops
Major League Baseball second basemen
Visalia Oaks players
Orlando Twins players
Portland Beavers players
Orlando Sun Rays players
Las Vegas 51s players
Nashville Sounds players
Mat-Su Miners players